Depew Union Free School District is a school district in Depew, New York, United States. The superintendent is Dr. Jeffrey Rabey. The district operates three schools: Depew High School, Depew Middle School, and Cayuga Heights Elementary School.

Administration
The district offices are located at 5201 Transit Road, inside of Depew High School and Middle School. The current superintendent is Mr. Jeffrey Rabey.

Selected former superintendents 
William F. Phelan
Marco F. Guerra–1959-1974 (Director of Guidance - Depew High School, retired)
George J. Drescher–1974-1988 (Principal - Cayuga Heights Elementary School, resigned)
Raymond Morningstar [interim]–1988-1989 (Assistant Superintendent - Depew Union Free School District, retired)
Judith P. Staples [interim] (Assistant Superintendent - Depew Union Free School District, returned to position)
Peter M. Brenner–1990-1992 (Superintendent - Schulyersville Central School District, named Superintendent of Washingtonville Central School District)
Eugene Hale–1992-1998 (Principal - Cayuga Heights Elementary School, retired)
Merton L. Haynes–1998-1998 [interim] (Interim Superintendent - Alden Central School District, retired)
Robert D. Olczak–1998-2001 (Superintendent - Starpoint Central School District, named Superintendent of Cattaraugus-Allegany BOCES)
Robert F. Defilippo–2001-2007 (Assistant Superintendent - Depew Union Free School District, retired)
Kimberly Mueller–2007-2010 (Director of Elementary Education - Lancaster Central School District, named Superintendent of Wellsville Central School District)
Dennis Ford–2010 [interim] (Superintendent - Amherst Central School District, named Interim Superintendent of Akron Central School District)

Depew Middle/High School

Depew Middle/High School is located at 5201 Transit Road and serves grades 6 through 12. The current principal is Mr. James Lupini.

History
Depew High School was housed at Depew Central School until 1954, when the current building opened. It consolidated with the middle school in 2020.

Selected former principals
Previous assignment and previous assignment denoted in parentheses
Elizabeth W. Earle–1929-1954 (Teacher - Depew School, retired)
Francis S. Kozub–1954-1979 (Social Studies teacher - Depew High School, retired)
Robert Farkas–1980-1990 (Vice Principal - Depew High School, retired)
George L. Morse–1990-1997 (Assistant Principal - Amherst Central High School, named Director of Curriculum & Instruction for Depew Union Free School District)
Edward E. Balaban–1997-2003 (Assistant Principal - Olean High School, resigned)
Carol A. Townsend–2003-2020 (Vice Principal - Depew High School, retired)

Notable alumni

Pete Scott– New York State High School Softball Hall of Fame Inductee - Class of 2014 (Softball Coach - Depew High School, retired)
Don Majkowski– Former Green Bay Packers quarterback; Green Bay Packers Hall of Fame Inductee - Class of 2005

Cayuga Heights Elementary

Cayuga Heights Elementary is located at 1780 Como Park Boulevard and serves grades K through 5. The current principal is Michelle Kudla.

History
Cayuga Heights Elementary School was built and opened in 1970.

Selected former principals
Previous assignment and reason for departure denoted in parentheses
George Drescher–1970-1974 (unknown, named Superintendent of Depew Union Free School District)
Eugene Hale–1979-1992 (Music Coordinator - Depew Union Free School District, named Superintendent of Depew Union Free School District)
Vicki Wright–1992-1995 (Principal - Fricano Elementary School, resigned)
Timothy Olsen–1995-1999 (Teacher - Cloverbank Elementary School, named Director of Special Programs for Depew Union Free Schools)
Robert J. Puchalski–1999-2011 (Assistant Principal - Cayuga Heights Elementary, placed on leave)

References

External links
Official site

Education in Erie County, New York
School districts in New York (state)